Miramar is a suburb of Wellington, New Zealand, south-east of the city centre. It is on the Miramar Peninsula, directly east of the isthmus of Rongotai, the site of Wellington International Airport.

History

See Miramar Peninsula for an extended history of the whole island/peninsula.

The original Māori name for the area when it was still an island was Te Motu Kairangi (meaning "esteemed" or "precious" island). The island is now a peninsula, but was separated from the main island by a sea channel called Te Awa-a-Taia (the channel of Taia); this was where Kilbirnie is now.
	
The island of Te Motu Kairangi was first settled as long ago as 950 when Kupe the explorer arrived. The area was home in turn to Ngai Tara, Rangitane, Ngati Kahungungu, Ngai Tahu, Mua Upoko, Ngati Ira, and Te Ati Awa. Kupe first landed near Seatoun, and a large rock near the shore still bears the name Te Ure-o-Kupe (Kupe’s penis) or Te Aroaro-o-Kupe (Kupe’s presence) 
	
Ngai Tara were the first to settle here, and built the first pa, named "Whetu Kairangi" on the hill overlooking Worser bay. The name of Wellington harbour "Whanganui-a-Tara" (harbour of Tara) was also named for Tara.

'Miramar' means "sea view" in Spanish. The name was chosen by the first European to settle in the area, Scotsman Coutts Crawford (1817-1889). Crawford was a former Royal Navy officer turned businessman and colonist, who arrived in Wellington in 1840. Crawford established a farm on the peninsula, which at the time was known as Watt's Peninsula, and drained a large lagoon known as Burnham Water. This lagoon covered much of the low-lying land on the peninsula; now this area is occupied by suburban houses, streets, parks and shops.

On 18 November 1904 Miramar Borough was formed. In April 1921, Miramar was incorporated into the City of Wellington. The records of the Miramar Borough Council were transferred to the City of Wellington at the time of amalgamation and can still be accessed today through Wellington City Council.

Demographics

Miramar had a population of 9,831 at the 2018 New Zealand census, an increase of 345 people (3.6%) since the 2013 census, and an increase of 621 people (6.7%) since the 2006 census. There were 3,585 households. There were 4,851 males and 4,989 females, giving a sex ratio of 0.97 males per female, with 1,881 people (19.1%) aged under 15 years, 1,770 (18.0%) aged 15 to 29, 4,794 (48.8%) aged 30 to 64, and 1,389 (14.1%) aged 65 or older.

Ethnicities were 66.6% European/Pākehā, 8.6% Māori, 9.3% Pacific peoples, 20.7% Asian, and 6.3% other ethnicities (totals add to more than 100% since people could identify with multiple ethnicities).

The proportion of people born overseas was 32.9%, compared with 27.1% nationally.

Although some people objected to giving their religion, 44.6% had no religion, 37.4% were Christian, 5.7% were Hindu, 1.4% were Muslim, 2.8% were Buddhist and 2.3% had other religions.

Of those at least 15 years old, 2,475 (31.1%) people had a bachelor or higher degree, and 1,206 (15.2%) people had no formal qualifications. The employment status of those at least 15 was that 4,302 (54.1%) people were employed full-time, 1,071 (13.5%) were part-time, and 282 (3.5%) were unemployed.

Film

Prior to World War II in 1936 the then government purchased an independent film company called Filmcraft in Darlington Rd, Miramar and set up a full body, government film production operation, to cover New Zealand's contribution in the war (and the 1940 Centennial celebrations). It was called the National Film Unit. In 1979 the NFU moved to Avalon, Lower Hutt, next to the national television entity Avalon Studios. In the late nineties, film director Sir Peter Jackson purchased the Film Unit, as it was then known, to produce his films. He used the NFU's facilities while making Braindead. Since then, Jackson has brought the Film Unit back to Miramar, which would now be seen as a sunset arm of his empire.

Jackson and his colleagues Sir Richard Taylor (VFX) and Jamie Selkirk (Editor) have built a series of multi million-dollar studios, sound stages, and pre- and post-production facilities in Miramar that include Stone Street Studios, Park Road Post, Weta Digital, and Weta Workshop. Jackson filmed the studio scenes of The Lord of the Rings trilogy and King Kong in Miramar. Miramar has been hailed by Mexican film director Guillermo del Toro as "Hollywood the way God intended it".

Roxy Cinema

Roxy Cinema at the Miramar shopping centre in Park Road opened as Capitol Theatre in 1928. The Capitol closed in 1964 and the building then became the Capitol Court shopping plaza. After lying abandoned for many years, the building was bought by Camperdown Studios Group in 2003. The façade was retained but the rest of the building was demolished and rebuilt as a two-screen movie theatre, opening  in 2011. As of 2022 the Roxy was owned by Jamie Selkirk and his wife Ann, Weta Workshop founder Tania Rodger, local foodie Valentina Dias, Daminda Dias, and renowned bartender and cocktail master Ray Letoa. The interior of the building is designed in a lush 1930s style. The upstairs lobby features a large ceiling mural by Greg Broadmore of Weta Workshop, which was inspired by the film Metropolis. An Oscar won by Jamie Selkirk was on display in the theatre, and a statue of Gandalf stands in front of the building.

Education

State primary schools

Christian primary schools

References

Bibliography
 

Suburbs of Wellington City
Populated places around the Wellington Harbour